Manasi Girishchandra Joshi (born 11 June 1989) is an Indian para-badminton player. She is a former world champion in the women's singles SL3 category. She started her professional sporting journey in 2015 and in 2020, she was ranked world no. 2 in women's singles in the SL3 category. On 8th of March 2022 she was ranked world no. 1 in women's singles in the SL3 category .

Manasi was listed as the Next Generation Leader 2020 by TIME Magazine in October 2020 and she appeared on their Asia cover, making her the first para-athlete in the world and the first Indian athlete to be featured on the magazine's cover, for being an advocate of rights for people with disabilities.

On the occasion of the International Day of Girl Child (11 October 2020), Barbie celebrated Manasi and her achievements by modelling a one-of-a-kind Barbie doll to her likeness to inspire young girls. She has also been recognized by BBC as one of the 100 most inspirational & powerful women across the world in 2020 and was nominated for the BBC Indian Sportswoman of the Year Award of 2020 alongside P. V. Sindhu, Mary Kom, Vinesh Phogat and Dutee Chand.

Early life and background 
Manasi was born in Rajkot, Gujarat and she was raised in Anushaktinagar, Mumbai.  She graduated in Electronics Engineering from K. J. Somaiya College of Engineering, University of Mumbai, in 2010. Sports lover, Manasi played sports such as football and badminton through her school and college life. Joshi was six when she started playing badminton with her father, a retired scientist from Bhabha Atomic Research Centre and over the years she represented her school, college and corporate at various tournaments. After finishing graduation in 2010, she worked as a software engineer until December 2011, when she met with a road accident while riding her motorbike to work, and her leg had to be amputated. After 45 days of hospitalisation, Manasi got discharged from MGM hospital Vashi, Navi Mumbai.

Career 
During 2012-2013 after her accident, Manasi started practicing yoga, meditation and badminton to regain her fitness. She played badminton as part of her rehabilitation and another para-badminton player urged her to try out for the national team; she was selected for Asian Para-Games 2014 and played her first international tournament in Spain. In 2015, Manasi along with her XD partner won a silver medal in mixed doubles at the BWF Para Badminton World Championship held in Stoke Mandeville, England. In 2018, she asked Pullela Gopichand to coach her, and enrolled in his badminton academy at Hyderabad.

In September 2015, Joshi won a silver medal in mixed doubles at the Para-Badminton World Championship held in Stoke Mandeville, England. In October 2018, she won a bronze medal for India at the Asian Para Games 2018, held in Jakarta, Indonesia. In August 2019, at the Para-Badminton World Championship 2019 in Basel, Switzerland, to win a gold medal.

Awards and recognition 

 2017 - Maharashtra Rajya Eklavya Khel Krida Puraskar (Highest State honour)
 2019 - National award for Best Sportsperson with Disability (female)
 2019 - Differently abled athlete of the year award at ESPN India Awards<ref>{{Cite web|title=Sindhu, Saurabh win ESPN Indias player of year award|url=https://www.outlookindia.com/newsscroll/sindhu-saurabh-win-espn-indias-player-of-year-award/1739395|access-date=2021-02-03|website=outlookindia.com}}</ref>
 2019 - Times of India Sports award for Best para-athlete of the year
 2019 - Aces 2020 Sportswoman of the Year (Para-sports) Hindu Newspaper (Nominee)
 2019 – BBC Indian Sportswoman of the Year
 2020 – TIME Next Generation Leader
 2020 - BBC 100 Women
 2020 – Forbes India, Self-made Women of 2020

 Achievements 
 World Championships Women's singlesMixed doubles Asian Para Games Women's singles Asian Championships Women's singles BWF Para Badminton World Circuit (4 titles, 6 runners-up) 
The BWF Para Badminton World Circuit – Grade 2, Level 1, 2 and 3 tournaments has been sanctioned by the Badminton World Federation from 2022.Women's singlesWomen's doublesMixed doubles International Tournaments (7 titles, 8 runners-up) Women's singlesWomen's doublesMixed doubles''

References

Notes 

Living people
Paralympic badminton players of India
1989 births
Indian female para-badminton players
People from Rajkot
21st-century Indian women
21st-century Indian people
Recipients of the Arjuna Award